These are the results of the women's team all-around competition, one of six events for female competitors in artistic gymnastics at the 1976 Summer Olympics in Montreal. There were a total of 14 events: 6 for women and 8 for men. The compulsory and optional rounds took place on July 18 and 19 at the Montreal Forum.

A new rule was introduced for both men's and women's events: only the three highest qualifiers from each country would be allowed to compete in the individual all-around.

Results
The final score for each team was determined by combining all of the scores earned by the team on each apparatus during the compulsory and optional rounds. If all six gymnasts on a team performed a routine on a single apparatus during compulsories or optionals, only the five highest scores on that apparatus counted toward the team total.

See also
Olympic medalists in gymnastics (men)
Olympic medalists in gymnastics (women)

References
*
www.gymnasticsresults.com
www.gymn-forum.net

Women's team all-around
1976 in women's gymnastics
Women's events at the 1976 Summer Olympics